The Notre Dame–UConn women's basketball rivalry is a college rivalry series between the UConn Huskies women's basketball team of the University of Connecticut and the Notre Dame Fighting Irish women's basketball team of the University of Notre Dame.  The Huskies and Fighting Irish have met 53 times, including eight times in the NCAA Tournament and twice in the NCAA Championship, with the Huskies holding a 39–14 advantage.

Background
The Connecticut Huskies and Notre Dame Fighting Irish women's basketball teams are two of the more successful teams in women's collegiate basketball. The UConn Huskies have won eleven national championships, while the Notre Dame Fighting Irish have nine Final Four appearances, with two National Championships in 2001 and 2018.  Both teams formerly played in the Big East Conference, and appeared in the title game of the Big East tournament multiple times, with UConn appearing 23 times between 1989 and 2013, and Notre Dame appearing seven times in the same time period.

From April 2011 to March 2013, Notre Dame won seven out of its eight match-ups with UConn, the best performance of any team against UConn since Tennessee. However, Notre Dame fell to UConn in the 2013 NCAA Division I women's basketball tournament despite Notre Dame beating them three times during the regular season that year.

In 2014, UConn and Notre Dame both went into the national championship undefeated. This is the first time two undefeated teams went to the title game in men's and women's NCAA Division I basketball history.  This was also their first meeting in a championship game. UConn won that game handily. The next year, both teams made it to the title game again, where UConn won its tenth national championship and third national championship in a row.  New York Times reporter Harvey Araton observed that in this "latest showdown between the premier women’s programs" there was an "absence of the mutual hostility" that had characterized the previous year's matchup.

After seven consecutive wins by UConn over Notre Dame, the Irish beat the Huskies in the semifinals of the 2018 NCAA Division I women's basketball tournament, in a controversial 91–89 overtime contest where Notre Dame had 23 free throw attempts to UConn's 6. Despite losing in a regular season matchup the following year, Notre Dame defeated UCONN again in the 2019 Final Four matchup 81-76.  From the start of the 2011–2012 season to the end of the 2018–2019 season, UConn has only 15 losses, with 8 of them coming against Notre Dame.

Game results

References 

Notre Dame Fighting Irish basketball
College basketball rivalries in the United States
Notre Dame Fighting Irish women's basketball
UConn Huskies women's basketball